Soroginskaya is a rural locality (a village) in Yavengskoye Rural Settlement, Vozhegodsky District, Vologda Oblast, Russia. The population was 64 as of 2002.

Geography 
Soroginskaya is located 20 km north of Vozhega (the district's administrative centre) by road. Proletarsky is the nearest rural locality.

References 

Rural localities in Vozhegodsky District